Tsakkar is a village in the Martuni Municipality of the Gegharkunik Province of Armenia.

Etymology 
The village was previously known as Dalikdash.

Gallery

References

External links 
 World Gazeteer: Armenia – World-Gazetteer.com
 
 
 

Populated places in Gegharkunik Province
Populated places established in 1828